Stringham may refer to:

People
 Edward Stringham (born 1975), American professor and writer
 Edwin Stringham (1890-1974), American composer
 Frank D. Stringham (1872-1931), American politician
 Irving Stringham (1847-1909), American mathematician
 Silas Stringham (1798-1876), American naval officer

Ships
 , more than one United States Navy ship